Central Lonsdale is a precinct in the city of North Vancouver, British Columbia, Canada. It extends from Keith Road to Highway 1 near 24th Street. Central Lonsdale is somewhat densely populated, having many apartment buildings and stores on Lonsdale Avenue.
Central Lonsdale is proud of many unique Green Homes such as first Net-Zero Home in whole Canada. 15th St West and Jones Ave, 20th St West and Mahon Ave as well as two side by side Green Homes at 19th St West and Jones Ave are examples of so advanced future homes.

North Vancouver (city)